Byron Douglas Thweatt (born March 21, 1978) is an American football coach and former player. He was the head football coach Virginia State University in 2015. Thweatt played college football as a linebacker at the University of Virginia and professionally in the National Football League (NFL) with the Tennessee Titans in 2001.

Head coaching record

References

External links
 Eat Carolina profile
 James Madison profile
 Just Sports Stats

1977 births
Living people
American football linebackers
East Carolina Pirates football coaches
James Madison Dukes football coaches
Richmond Spiders football coaches
Tennessee Titans players
Virginia Cavaliers football coaches
Virginia Cavaliers football players
Virginia State Trojans football coaches
People from Chesterfield County, Virginia
Sportspeople from Petersburg, Virginia
Players of American football from Virginia
African-American coaches of American football
African-American players of American football
21st-century African-American sportspeople
20th-century African-American sportspeople